Tathiana Garbin and Janette Husárová were the defending champions, but none competed this year. Husárová chose to compete at Charleston in the same week.

Catherine Barclay and Émilie Loit won the title by defeating 4–6, 6–3, 6–3 in the final.

Seeds

Draw

Draw

Qualifying

Qualifying seeds

Qualifiers
  Iveta Benešová /  Ľubomíra Kurhajcová

Lucky losers
  Jelena Kostanić /  Silvija Talaja

Qualifying draw

References

External links
 Official results archive (ITF)
 Official results archive (WTA)

Budapest Grand Prix - Doubles
Budapest Grand Prix